Carpathonesticus mamajevae  is an araneomorph spider species of the family Nesticidae. It occurs in Georgia, in the Lagodekhi Nature Reserve.

Description
The prosoma has a length of 1.6–2.9 mm and a width of 1.4–2.2 mm in females. In males, the prosoma length is 2.0–2.7 mm and the width 1.6–2.0 mm.

Original publication

References 

Nesticidae
Spiders described in 1987
Spiders of Georgia (country)